Joan Merriam Smith (August 3, 1936 – February 17, 1965) was an American aviator famous for her 1964 solo flight around the world that began and ended in Oakland, California, as she set out to follow the same route as the 1937 flight plan of Amelia Earhart. Joan was the first person in history to fly solo around the world at the equator, the first person to complete the longest single solo flight around the world, the first woman to fly a twin-engine aircraft around the world, the first woman to fly the Pacific Ocean from west to east in a twin-engine plane, the first woman to receive an airline transport rating at the age of 23, and the youngest woman to complete a solo flight around the world. Joan had attempted to become the first woman to circumnavigate the globe by herself, but another woman, Jerrie Mock, set off during the same week and would complete the task earlier.   

Joan was an accomplished and experienced pilot. By the age of seventeen, Joan had already obtained her private pilot's license and soloed for thirty-five hours. At seventeen, Joan was also the youngest entrant in the All Woman's International Air Race. By age twenty-three, Joan became the first woman to achieve the Airline Transport Rating (ATR) at the minimum possible age. In 1960, she married Lt. Commander Marvin "Jack" Smith, Jr.

After completion of her historic world flight in 1964, Joan was involved in two plane crashes following some 8,500 hours of logged flying time with zero accidents. In the first, Joan was forced to make a crash landing in the California desert on January 9, 1965 when her electrical system caught fire. A few weeks later on February 17, 1965, Joan died at age 28 when the light aircraft that she was piloting out of Long Beach Airport crashed into the San Gabriel Mountains near Big Pines, California, killing her and foreign news correspondent, Trixie Ann Schubert.

She posthumously received the Harmon Trophy for Outstanding Aviatrix of 1964, which was announced by then Vice President Hubert Humphrey at the White House. In 1966, The Ninety-Nines set up a memorial fund for Smith, and in 1969, John H. Reading, then Mayor of Oakland, California declared May 12 as "Amelia Earhart-Joan Merriam Aviation Day".

Further reading
Racing to Greet the Sun, Jerrie Mock and Joan Merriam Smith Duel to Become the First Woman to Solo Around the World (2015), by Taylor Phillips

References

1936 births
1965 deaths
Accidental deaths in California
American women aviators
Aviation pioneers
Aviators from California
Aviators killed in aviation accidents or incidents in the United States
Oakland, California
Victims of aviation accidents or incidents in 1965